Cortegaça may refer to:
 Cortegaça, Ovar, a city in Portugal
 Cortegaça, Mortágua, a city in Portugal